Henry Jennings (9 April 1849 – 6 June 1925) was an Australian cricketer. He played one first-class cricket match for Victoria in 1873.

See also
 List of Victoria first-class cricketers

References

External links
 

1849 births
1925 deaths
Australian cricketers
Victoria cricketers
Cricketers from Launceston, Tasmania